Adam Richard Snyder (born January 30, 1982) is a former American football offensive guard. He was drafted in the third round in the 2005 NFL Draft by the San Francisco 49ers. He also played for the Arizona Cardinals and the New York Giants.

At the University of Oregon he was one of the most dominant and versatile linemen in the Pac-10 conference and the winner of the Morris Trophy, as he played every position but center. His junior and senior seasons he was considered one of the premier left offensive tackles in college football.

Early years
Adam Snyder attended La Serna High School in Whittier, California, where he played football. He was coached by Ken LaVigne from 1999 to 2000.

College career
Snyder was redshirted in 2000 at Oregon and saw action in the final 11 games of the 2001 season, when he served as the for the year.

Snyder departed as one of Oregon's most decorated linemen of all time, becoming the Ducks' third Morris Trophy recipient (as the Pac-10 Conference's top lineman) ever. The three-year starter and the school's first two-time first-team all-league offensive line stalwart in four decades extended his string of career starting assignments to 35 at three different positions while playing in 48 of 49 outings.

Professional career

San Francisco 49ers
Snyder played often throughout his first 3 years with the 49ers, playing every position on the offensive line with the exception of center. His versatility and team first mentality earned him a contract extension in 2006 that put him with the 49ers through the 2009 season. He became a full-time starter before the 2009 season. Snyder signed a contract extension in 2009, keeping him with the team through the 2011 season. He has since become the starting right guard.

Arizona Cardinals
Snyder signed a five-year contract with the Arizona Cardinals on March 14, 2012.  He was released by the Cardinals on April 29, 2013.

San Francisco 49ers (second stint) 
Snyder signed a two-year deal with the 49ers on May 6, 2013. He was released by the team on August 30, 2014

New York Giants
Snyder was signed by the New York Giants on September 3, 2014.

Personal life
Snyder has a journalism and public relations degree. He is the son of Richard and Judi Snyder.  He has a sister named Bree. Adam was married in the summer of 2006 to Erika Widmark.  He and his wife gave birth to their first child, Kael Richard, in October 2008. They welcomed their second child in September 2010. He was a friend of The Howard Stern Show Wack Pack personality Eric the Actor.

References

External

San Francisco 49ers bio

1982 births
Living people
Sportspeople from Fullerton, California
Players of American football from California
American football offensive guards
American football offensive tackles
Oregon Ducks football players
San Francisco 49ers players
Arizona Cardinals players
New York Giants players